Bay Shore Methodist Episcopal Church, also known as the United Methodist Church of Bay Shore, is a historic Methodist Episcopal church complex at E. Main Street at the junction of Second Avenue in Bay Shore, Suffolk County, New York.  The complex consists of three attached units: the 1893 Richardsonian Romanesque-style church; the Gothic Revival style former church building built in 1867, relocated and now attached to the main church as the "Fellowship Hall," and a two-story, flat roofed Sunday School wing built in 1959.

It was added to the National Register of Historic Places in 2001.

References

External links
United Methodist Church of Bay Shore (Official Site)

Methodist churches in New York (state)
Churches on the National Register of Historic Places in New York (state)
Gothic Revival church buildings in New York (state)
Queen Anne architecture in New York (state)
Romanesque Revival church buildings in New York (state)
Churches completed in 1867
19th-century Methodist church buildings in the United States
Churches in Suffolk County, New York
National Register of Historic Places in Suffolk County, New York